St. John's in the Wilderness Episcopal Church is an Episcopal church in Paul Smiths in the Adirondacks, New York State, United States. It was founded in 1876 by Dr. Edward Livingston Trudeau with the help of Paul Smith and many of the wealthy camp owners around Spitfire, Upper, and Lower Saint Regis Lakes.  The original log building burned in 1928, and was replaced by the present structure, designed by William G. Distin, in 1930.  The non-denominational cemetery surrounding the church contains the graves of Dr. Trudeau, Paul Smith, Charles Minot Dole (founder of the National Ski Patrol), Clifford R. Pettis (the father of reforestation) and several other notable residents of the area.

External links

 Town of Brighton, St. John's in the Wilderness
 New York Times, July 8, 1906, "Worship in the Wilderness; Campers on St. Regis Lake Gather in Little Log Chapel."

Adirondacks
Churches in Franklin County, New York
Cemeteries in Franklin County, New York
Episcopal church buildings in New York (state)
Paul Smiths, New York